Kuhdasht (also Romanized as Kūhdasht and Kūh-ī-Dasht) is a city in and capital of Kuhdasht County, Lorestan Province, Iran. At the 2016 census, its population was 102,285, in 27,994 families. The people of the city speak Laki Kurdish and are Shia Muslim.

Climate

References

Towns and villages in Kuhdasht County
Cities in Lorestan Province

Kurdish settlements in Iran